Zziwa is a surname. Notable people with the surname include:

Keiron Zziwa (born 1997), Canadian-Ugandan professional basketball player
Margaret Zziwa (born 1963), Ugandan politician and legislator
Joseph Anthony Zziwa (born 1956), Ugandan Roman Catholic prelate
kennedy Katebalirwe Zziwa (born 1987), Ugandan celebrity hairstylist 

Surnames of African origin